Qazvin County is in Qazvin province, Iran. The capital of the county is the city of Qazvin. At the 2006 census, the county's population was 530,961 in 142,781 households. The following census in 2011 counted 566,773 people in 169,078 households. At the 2016 census, the county's population was 596,932 in 188,460 households.

Persians, Azeris and Tats are the largest ethnic groups of people. According to some sources, the majority of people in northern Qazvin (Alamut) are Tats who speak a dialect of the Tati language. However, other sources claim that the majority of people in Alamut are Mazanderani or Gilaks who speak a dialect of the Mazanderani language or Gilaki language. According to some linguists, the term ‘Tati’ was used by Turkic speakers to refer to non-turkic speakers. This could explain why some sources claim the people of Alamut are Tats, while others claim they are Mazanderanies or Gilaks. Likely, the ‘Tats’ of Alamut are Mazanderani or Gilak speakers who have been labeled as Tats as historically they were considered Mazanderani or Gilaks.

Administrative divisions

The population history of Qazvin County's administrative divisions over three consecutive censuses is shown in the following table. The latest census shows five districts, 14 rural districts, and seven cities.

References

 

Counties of Qazvin Province